"Hocus Pocus" is a song by the Dutch rock band Focus, written by keyboardist, flutist, and vocalist Thijs van Leer and guitarist Jan Akkerman. It was recorded and released in 1971 as the opening track of their second studio album Moving Waves. An edited version was released as a single (with "Janis" as the B-side) on the Imperial, Polydor and Blue Horizon labels in Europe in 1971, but failed to chart outside of the Netherlands(NL#09).

A faster re-recording of the song (titled "Hocus Pocus 2" or "Hocus Pocus II" in some markets) was released in Europe in 1972. Buoyed by a live performance on The Old Grey Whistle Test in December 1972 and a subsequent barnstorming British club tour, this version rose to No. 20 on the UK charts in late January 1973. "Hocus Pocus" was also released as a single on the Sire Records label in the United States and Canada in 1973. It peaked at No. 9 on the Billboard Hot 100 the weeks of June 2 and 9 in the US and No. 18 in Canada during the spring and summer of that year.

The song was given new life when it became the musical signature of the Nike Write the Future advertising campaign, shown during the 2010 FIFA World Cup. That year the single re-entered the UK charts at No. 57 and on the Dutch charts at No. 48.

Description
"Hocus Pocus" takes the form of a rondo, consisting of alternation between a powerful rock chord riff with short drum solos and then varied solo "verses" (in the original all performed by Thijs van Leer) which include yodeling, eefing, organ playing, accordion, scat singing, flute riffs, and whistling. The single version is significantly edited from the album version.
"Hocus Pocus 2" is a slightly faster version with some funk elements and rhythms added. It was released as a single in its own right in Europe and was the B-side to the North American release of "Hocus Pocus". When performing live, Focus would play "Hocus Pocus" even faster.

Chart performance

Weekly charts

Year-end charts

References

External links
 Hocus Pocus tabulature on Guitartab

1971 songs
1973 singles
1970s instrumentals
Focus (band) songs
Imperial Records singles
Polydor Records singles
Sire Records singles